Kleber Mendonça Filho (born 3 November 1968) is a Brazilian film director, screenwriter, producer, and critic.

Life and career
With a degree in journalism from the Federal University of Pernambuco, Kleber Mendonça Filho began his career as a film critic and journalist. He wrote for newspapers such as Jornal do Commercio and Folha de S. Paulo, for magazines such as Continente and Cinética, and for his own site, CinemaScópio.

As a director, he experimented with fiction, documentary, and video clips in the 1990s. He migrated from video to digital and 35 mm film in the 2000s. Over the course of that decade, he made several short films, including A Menina do Algodão (co-directed by Daniel Bandeira, 2002), Vinil Verde (2004), Eletrodoméstica (2005), Noite de Sexta Manhã de Sábado (2006), and Recife Frio (2009), as well as a feature-length documentary, Crítico (2008).

O Som ao Redor (Neighbouring Sounds, 2013) was Mendonça's first feature-length drama, winning numerous awards. Film critic AO Scott of The New York Times included it in his list of the 10 best films of 2012. Caetano Veloso, in his column in the newspaper O Globo, classified it as "one of the best movies made recently in the world ". The critic Lucas Salgado of AdoroCinema website, gave the film a score of 5 out of 5, writing, "The film talks in a subtle way and uses sound so rarely seen in world cinema." Lucas reported that the movie is "beautiful, fun, scary and captivating," and also said "it's not a movie that needs to shout to be heard, does not need big dramatic scenes to reach its goal or even to tell a story."

In 2016, his next feature film, Aquarius premiered in competition at the Cannes Film Festival and was later nominated for Best International Film at the 32nd Independent Spirit Awards and the César Award for best foreign film, but lost to Maren Ade's Toni Erdmann and to Ken Loach's I, Daniel Blake, respectively.

In 2013, he was the jury president of the Semaine de la Critique section of the 2017 Cannes Film Festival.

His third film, Bacurau, written and directed with Juliano Dornelles, won the Jury Prize at the 2019 Cannes Film Festival, shared with  Les Misérables.

Mendonça's films have received more than 120 awards in Brazil and abroad, with selections in festivals such as New York, Copenhagen and Cannes (Quinzaine des réalisateurs). Film festivals in Rotterdam, Toulouse, and Santa Maria da Feira have presented retrospectives of his films. He has served as programmer of cinema for the Joaquim Nabuco Foundation.

Filmography

References

External links
 

1968 births
Living people
Brazilian film directors
People from Recife
Federal University of Pernambuco alumni
Brazilian screenwriters
Brazilian film producers
Silver Condor Award for Best Ibero-American Film winners